Manège is the French word for a riding academy. As a loanword in Russian it is transliterated back into Latin script as Manezh (Манеж) or Manege.

It may refer to any riding school, riding arena or exercise rectangle, or specifically to:

 the Salle du Manège in Paris, France

or, also with the spelling "Manezh", to one of the following:

 the Veliky Novgorod Manege in Veliky Novgorod, Russia
 the Konnogvardeisky Manege in St. Petersburg, Russia
 the Mikhailovsky Manege in Petersburg
 the Moscow Manege in Moscow, Russia
 Manezhnaya Square (disambiguation), in Moscow and St.Petersburg

In Russia and the post Imperial Russian states the word "manezh" is also used for indoor stadium or sports hall built to conduct any team sports or various athletic events.

See also
 Manege (circus), a circular stage in the center of a circus tent
 Ménage (disambiguation)